The 13th Men's World Fistball Championships was held from the 7th to 13 August 2011 in Austria. A total of 24 teams qualified for the World Championships, with those 24 teams initially split into four pools of three teams for the preliminary rounds. These preliminary rounds were followed by qualifying matches leading into the quarterfinals, semifinals, and then a final. In addition, classification matches were held for places three to twelve to determine final placings. Germany was crowned World Champion after defeating defending champions Austria 4:2 in the final, recording their record 10th Men's Fistball World Championship.

The preliminary rounds were held in Kremsmünster, Linz, Salzburg and Wien, the quarterfinals in Linz, and the classification and finals matches at Waldstadion in Pasching.

This was the third time a Men's Fistball World Championships was held on Austria soil, after the inaugural 1968 World Championships in Linz, and the 1990 World Championships in Vöcklabruck.

Participants 
The World Championships were played with 12 participants, qualifying from the 24 member states and 11 partner associations of the International Fistball Association.

Qualifications 
From the listed 35 member associations of the IFA, 12 teams qualified (highlighted) for the 2011 Men's Fistball World Championships.

 Africa:

Structure 
All matches of the World Championships were played to three winning sets (best of five sets) except for the semifinals, Third Place Playoff and Final; which were played to four winning sets (best of seven sets).

Preliminary round 
 In the first round (A to D) was played with three teams a simple round into four groups. The games took place in Vienna and Salzburg.

Second round 
All matches in the second round took place in Kremsmünster and Linz.
 The four group winners of the preliminary round played in the second round in Group E, the four third-placed teams played in Group F.
 The four runners-up of the group stage played off in qualifiers to determine which two winning teams would move to Group E, with the two defeated teams moving to Group F.
 All team in Group E and the top two teams in Group F played in the quarterfinals with the matchups of 1.E vs 2.F, 2.E vs 1.F, 3.E vs 6.E and 4.E vs 5.E.
 The third to sixth-placed teams in Group F played in Qualifying Matches to determine rankings for the classification matches to be played for positions 9th to 12th.
 The losing teams from the quarterfinals also played in Qualifying Matches to determine rankings for the classification matches to be played for positions 5th to 8th

Final round 
The matches being played for the Final, Third Place Playoff and Classification matches were played at Waldstadion in Pasching.
 The winners of the quarterfinals played off in the Final
 The losers of the quarterfinals played off in the Third-place final
 All other teams played off for final positions.

Venues 

All matches were played across 5 locations in Austria, with the final round held in Pasching.

Schedule

Preliminary Rounds 

Group A and B matches were played in Vienna, Group C and D in Salzburg

Group A

Group B

Group C

Group D

Qualifying Playoff 

Preliminary round runners-up of each group played off to qualify for Group E in the second round. The runners-up of Group A and B played off in one match, while the runners-up of Group C and D played off in the other. The winners qualified for Group E in the second round, while the losers were placed into Group F.

Second round 

The games of the second round took place in Kremsmünster and Linz.

Group E

Group F

Quarterfinals 
The quarterfinals were held in Linz.

Qualifying Finals 
The Qualifying Finals were held in Pasching and Linz.

Semifinals 
The semifinals were held in Pasching.

The winners of each Semifinal moved into the Final, while the losers played off for third place.

Classification matches 
The Classification Matches were held at the Waldstadion in Pasching.

Third-place final

Final

Final Placings

References

External links 
 2011 Fistball World Championships Official Website

Fistball World Championships